Cavipalpia translucidella is a species of snout moth in the genus Cavipalpia. It was described by Ragonot, in 1893. It is found in India.

References

Moths described in 1893
Phycitini